Mahadirga Maranando "Dirga" Lasut (born 17 August 1988, in Tomohon, Sulawesi Utara) is an Indonesian professional footballer who plays as a midfielder for and captains Liga 2 club Sulut United.

Club career

Borneo
In 2018, Dirga signed a contract with Indonesian Liga 1 club Borneo. He made his league debut on 25 March 2018 in a match against Sriwijaya at the Segiri Stadium, Samarinda.

Sulut United
He was signed for Sulut United to play in Liga 2 in the 2020 season. This season was suspended on 27 March 2020 due to the COVID-19 pandemic. The season was abandoned and was declared void on 20 January 2021.

International career
In 2011, Mahadirga represented the Indonesia U-23, in the 2011 Southeast Asian Games.

Honours

Club
Sriwijaya
 Indonesian Community Shield: 2010
 Indonesian Inter Island Cup: 2010

International
Indonesia U-23
Southeast Asian Games  Silver medal: 2011

References

External links 
 
 Mahadirga Lasut at Liga Indonesia

1985 births
Living people
Indonesian footballers
People from Tomohon
Sportspeople from North Sulawesi
Minahasa people
Liga 1 (Indonesia) players
Persmin Minahasa players
Persiraja Banda Aceh players
Persih Tembilahan players
Sriwijaya F.C. players
Mitra Kukar players
Gresik United players
Persita Tangerang players
Indonesian Premier Division players
Association football midfielders
Southeast Asian Games silver medalists for Indonesia
Southeast Asian Games medalists in football
Competitors at the 2011 Southeast Asian Games
21st-century Indonesian people